Brigadier Frederick Richard Webster (31 December 1914 – 28 September 2009) was a British Army officer and Olympic pole vaulter.

Sports career

Educated at Bedford School and Christ's College, Cambridge, Webster competed in both the 1936 Olympics and the 1948 Olympics. He held the British pole vaulting record between 1936 and 1950.

He also competed for England in the pole vault at the 1934 British Empire Games in London and four years later he competed for England at the 1938 British Empire Games in the pole vault again. 

He was the 1936 and 1939 AAA champion.

Personal life
Webster served as an officer in the Royal Artillery during the Second World War, was evacuated from Dunkirk, and fought in North Africa and Italy. After the war, he worked as a military instructor in Egypt, retiring from the army with the rank of brigadier in 1967. Following his retirement, he worked as a farmer in South Africa.

References 

 

People educated at Bedford School
Alumni of Christ's College, Cambridge
1914 births
2009 deaths
Athletes (track and field) at the 1936 Summer Olympics
Athletes (track and field) at the 1948 Summer Olympics
Athletes (track and field) at the 1934 British Empire Games
Athletes (track and field) at the 1938 British Empire Games
Olympic athletes of Great Britain
British male pole vaulters
Royal Artillery officers
British Army personnel of World War II
Commonwealth Games competitors for England
South African farmers
English expatriates in South Africa